Porika Naik Balram known as Balram Naik (born 6 June 1964) is an Indian politician and a member of the Indian National Congress political party. He was a member of the 15th Lok Sabha, Lower House of the Parliament of India.

Early life
Balram was born in Madanapalli, Warangal in a rural Banjara family to Laxman Naik and Lakshmi. He holds the Bachelor of Arts degree from Andhra University.

Career
Balram Naik was a police constable and then was into real estate business before entering politics in 2009.

He  was elected to 15th Lok Sabha in 2009 and he represents Mahabubabad, a parliamentary constituency in Andhra Pradesh state. He was a member, Committee on Labour.

He was inducted into Manmohan Singhs cabinet as Minister of State in October 2012. Now he is an ex MP.

Social and cultural activities
Balram is involved in social work for upliftment and welfare of Tribal persons in the State of Andhra Pradesh and running Old age homes to provide shelter to elderly persons and sick persons.

Personal life
Balram Naik is married to Tirupatamma and has two sons.

References

Living people
1964 births
People from Telangana
Telangana politicians
Union Ministers from Telangana
Indian National Congress politicians
India MPs 2009–2014
People from Hanamkonda district
Lok Sabha members from Andhra Pradesh
Indian National Congress politicians from Andhra Pradesh